Awsworth railway station was a former railway station in Awsworth, Nottinghamshire. It was opened by the Great Northern Railway on its Derbyshire and Staffordshire Extension in 1875–6.

History 

It was situated on a down grade between Kimberley East railway station and the crossing of the Erewash Valley, which it crossed by means of the impressive Bennerley Viaduct which has been partly preserved. Nearby was Awsworth Junction where a branch led north towards Eastwood and Langley Mill and Pinxton crossing the impressive Giltbrook Viaduct known locally as "Forty Bridges".

Opened by the Great Northern Railway, it became part of the London and North Eastern Railway during the Grouping of 1923. The station then passed to the London Midland Region of British Railways on nationalisation in 1948.

It was then closed by the British Railways Board.

The site today

The station house is still there on a path past the site.

References

Further reading

External links
 Awsworth station on navigable 1947 O. S. map 

Disused railway stations in Nottinghamshire
Railway stations in Great Britain opened in 1880
Railway stations in Great Britain closed in 1964
Former Great Northern Railway stations
Beeching closures in England
Borough of Broxtowe